Leslie Butler is a New Zealand cricketer. Leslie Butler may also refer to:

Leslie B. Butler, American politician
Leslie Butler (athlete), English athlete